Cytochrome P450 2A6 (abbreviated CYP2A6) is a member of the cytochrome P450 mixed-function oxidase system, which is involved in the metabolism of xenobiotics in the body. CYP2A6 is the primary enzyme responsible for the oxidation of nicotine and cotinine. It is also involved in the metabolism of several pharmaceuticals, carcinogens, and a number of coumarin-type alkaloids. CYP2A6 is the only enzyme in the human body that appreciably catalyzes the 7-hydroxylation of coumarin, such that the formation of the product of this reaction, 7-hydroxycoumarin, is used as a probe for CYP2A6 activity.

The CYP2A6 gene is part of a large cluster of cytochrome P450 genes from the CYP2A, CYP2B and CYP2F subfamilies on chromosome 19q. The gene was formerly referred to as CYP2A3; however, it has been renamed CYP2A6.

Interactive pathway map

Distribution
CYP2A6 localizes to the endoplasmic reticulum and is found predominantly in the liver.

Variability
Significant interindividual variability in CYP2A6 apoprotein and mRNA levels has been observed.

Induction
CYP2A6 is known to be inducible by phenobarbital and rifampicin, and it is suspected that other antiepileptic drugs may also have this effect.

CYP2A6 Ligands

See also 
 List of cytochrome P450 modulators

References

Further reading

External links
 
 

2